Faik Türün (17 October 1913, Bursa - 15 February 2003) was a Turkish general. He served in the Korean War as the Chief of Operations for the Turkish Brigade and was awarded the Silver Star by General Douglas MacArthur. He was the Commander of the First Army of Turkey during the 1971 Turkish coup d'état. He was one of the leading persons associated with the Counter-Guerrilla in the 1970s, and obstructed a coup plot of young "socialist" officers in that capacity, which was planned to take place on March 9, 1971 under the tutelage of the then Turkish Air Force commander General Muhsin Batur. He led Operation Sledgehammer (associated with the Ziverbey Villa) against these officers and the associated journalists and writers, who were supposed to have been plotting a coup to establish a new government with strong socialist tendencies. During this operation, it is claimed by several journalists and politicians that Faik Türün was behind the tortures of political opponents in Ziverbey Villa .  After retirement from the Army, he was elected to Turkish Parliament as a deputy for the conservative and right-wing Justice Party from 1977, representing Manisa.

References 

1913 births
2003 deaths
Turkish Army generals
People from Bursa
Deputies of Manisa
Recipients of the Silver Star
Turkish military personnel of the Korean War